Edwin Delos Coe (June 11, 1840May 5, 1909) was an American newspaper editor, publisher, and Republican politician.  He was a member of the Wisconsin State Assembly, representing northern Walworth County in 1878 and 1879.  He subsequently served as chief clerk of the Assembly for four terms and was elected chairman of the Republican Party of Wisconsin in 1896.

Biography

Born in Ixonia, Wisconsin Territory, Coe went to Wayland Academy in Beaver Dam, Wisconsin, and then to University of Wisconsin–Madison. He served in the Union Army during the American Civil War. In 1866, Coe was admitted to the Wisconsin Bar and was the editor of the Whitewater Register. He served in the Wisconsin State Assembly in 1878 and 1879 as a Republican. He then served as chief clerk in the Wisconsin State Assembly in 1882, 1885, 1887, and 1889. He was head of the United States Pension Agency in Milwaukee, Wisconsin for ten years. He was also chairman of the Wisconsin Republican Party Central Committee. He died at his home in Whitewater, Wisconsin.

Notes

External links
 
 

1840 births
1909 deaths
People from Ixonia, Wisconsin
People from Whitewater, Wisconsin
People of Wisconsin in the American Civil War
University of Wisconsin–Madison alumni
Editors of Wisconsin newspapers
Wisconsin lawyers
Employees of the Wisconsin Legislature
Republican Party members of the Wisconsin State Assembly
19th-century American politicians
Wayland Academy, Wisconsin alumni